Combined Universities GAA was a Gaelic football and hurling team that was made up of players from the major universities of Ireland. The players were taken from St Patrick's College, Maynooth, Queen's University Belfast, Trinity College Dublin, University College Cork, University College Dublin, University of Ulster at Jordanstown, and University College Galway. In the 1980s Combined Advanced Colleges GAA (Combined Colleges) joined in to make the annual contests between Combined Universities, Army (Defence Forces) and Garda a quadrangular tournament.

History
The concept of a match between Combined Colleges of the National University of Ireland and the All-Ireland Champion teams in hurling and gaelic football was first mooted by University College Dublin during the 1929–30 season. UCD argued that Combined Universities representative teams already competed against national sides in other sports such as rugby and hockey and that the introduction of like matches in Gaelic games would not only increase the profile of Gaelic sports in Universities but also the prestige of Gaelic games in the community.  The Central Council of the Gaelic Athletic Association was initially cool to this proposal, particularly on financial grounds. However, in March 1931 a delegation from UCD went to Croke Park to advance this proposition. On this occasion, the Central Council approved the idea of an annual series of matches. Unfortunately, the first hurling match in April 1931 between an NUI Colleges Select team (6 from UCC, 5 from UCG and 4 from UCD) and the All-Ireland Champions Tipperary at Thurles was disastrous in terms of furthering the concept of an annual series of games. Tipperary proved far too strong for the NUI Select hurlers and won the match without a point being registered against them. The football match between the All-Ireland Champions Kerry and the NUI Select did not take place. On the basis that such uncompetitive games would not be attractive to spectators, the idea was dropped.

The next attempt to embrace representative games for the NUI Colleges Select team came in 1933 with an international hurling/shinty match between an Irish Universities team and the Southern Scottish Shinty League at Govan, Glasgow on 6 May. The Irish Universities won 1–0. The game was deemed a great success as an exhibition of highly skilled use of two forms of club. However, the hope of an annual match died when the Camanachd Association, the shinty governing body, was advised of the GAA's anti-British political stance.

The 1940s saw numerous inter-county standard players involved in intervarsity championships, the Sigerson Cup and Fitzgibbon Cup competitions. The 'Combined Universities' concept was again mooted on the grounds that such a representative team would positively advertise Gaelic games within and without universities. After the 1946–47 intervarsity tournaments representative football and hurling sides were picked to play the All-Ireland champions. The hurling match did not take place.  The match between All-Ireland football champions Kerry and the Combined Universities Select at Tralee in May 1947, which was won by Kerry, was described as 'a very dull and uninteresting affair', possibly because there was nothing more than the winning of the match at stake Both teams were below published strengths; almost one-third of the selected sides did not play. Again hopes of an annual match faded.

Despite these setbacks the Universities persevered with their attempts to establish representative matches for Combined Universities Select teams. In 1950 these efforts were rewarded with a Combined Universities v Rest of Ireland football match at Croke Park. The prize for this match was the Dr John Ryan Memorial Cup which was donated by Dr Joseph Stuart, a former UCD student who hailed from Ogonnelloe, County Clare and future President of the GAA (1958–61). John Ryan was a student at UCD in the 1910s who led the UCD hurlers to two Fitzgibbon Cup victories and captained Dublin to All-Ireland Hurling success in 1917. The 1950 match received extensive press coverage, was aired on radio and attended by over 20,000 spectators. Although the students lost by six points, they did the University sector proud in this high profile game. The match was praised as the kind of football that would throng Croke Park any Sunday. The Combined Universities v Rest of Ireland, sometimes called GAA Ireland, annual series of matches had had a joyous birth.

The Combined Universities team took part in exhibition games against the Rest of Ireland GAA or GAA Ireland team throughout the 1950s. These were halcyon days for University Gaelic sportsmen due to the high profile of these matches. From 1952 the annual match was a double-billed event of hurling and football. Many top players in both codes competed. While many games were well attended (15–20,000 spectators), these matches failed to arouse the same passion or allegiance associated with inter-club, inter-county or inter-provincial games. The Combined Universities hurling also suffered from a lack of highly talented players who could compete against the cream of inter-county hurling players. After the 1956 hurling game, this match was dropped. The Combined Universities versus GAA Ireland football games faded out in the 1960s despite attempts to spice up the annual series with matches against The Army and Inter-County sides.

The 1970s saw an expansion of the number of participating university colleges in both the Sigerson and Fitzgibbon Cup competitions. The removal of the GAA's Rule 27 in 1971 banning playing of 'foreign games' freed students to play sport in a much more open manner within the ethos of a broad university education and sporting life.

The Combined Universities concept was revived in 1972 with the admission of elite selections from the Sigerson and Fitzgibbon Cup competitions to the inter-provincial Railway Cup competition in their respective codes. The Central Council of the GAA agreed to a proposal from Comhairle na nOllscoil on a trial basis. The inter-provincial series had been flagging in terms of public interest and it was thought that the introduction of a competitive 'fifth province' would revive the popularity of the Railway Cup competitions by adding a new element of spice. In hurling the Combined Universities team did not match the stronger provinces. In football, the Combined Universities won the Railway Cup in 1973 by beating Connacht in the final at Athlone. However, after three years the foray of the Combined Universities into inter-provincial competition ended.

A further attempt to provide representative games emerged in 1976 when the Combined Universities played the Combined Services in both codes at The Mardyke, Cork. Following on the classic encounter in the first Hodges Figgis Trophy match between the Sigerson Cup and Trench Cup winners in 1976, the Advanced Colleges (a non-university combination) joined the football representative matches in 1977. The first football match between the Advanced Colleges Select and Combined Universities resulted in a win for the former. In 1978, Advanced Colleges beat Combined Services to play Combined Universities in a final match. With the Combined Services splitting into Garda and Irish Army teams in 1979, the football matches developed into a four-way mini-tournament format between these teams. Advanced Colleges joined the hurling tournament in 1981 to make this a four-team tournament. These series in varying formats continued until the mid-1990s.

Within the Universities and Advanced Colleges, selection for the representative teams carried considerable prestige, particularly for the smaller and less successful institutions.  One of the major difficulties was finding dates for the matches that steered clear of inter-county and club fixtures. The last Combined Universities match took place in 2000 against a British Universities Select in Manchester to celebrate the Millennium.

Gaelic Football

Hurling

Railway Cup

In 1971 the Universities Council of the GAA (Comhairle na nOllscoil) applied to the Central Council of the GAA for permission to compete in the Railway Cup football and hurling series. The request had been studied by the Executive of the Central Council. The Universities Council estimated that there were about 70 inter-county players in the Sigerson and Fitzgibbon competitions studying at U.C.D, U.C.G., U.C.C., Q.U.B., T.C.D., U.U. Coleraine and St Patrick's Maynooth. At the Central Council meeting held on 23 October 1971, the proposal of Comhairle na nOllscoil was approved unanimously. While the idea was looked upon positively by some elements of the Press as a way of injecting life back into this inter-provincial tournament, other feared that the public would tire of this innovation as they had in the case of the Combined Universities v (Rest of) Ireland tests long before they lingered to an unlamented death and doubted whether the Combined Universities would revive the Railway Cup. Pat McDonnell of UCC and Cork full-back, Texaco Hurler of the Year in 1969, had the honour of captaining the first Combined Universities team to compete in the Railway Cup against Ulster at Croke Park. The University hurlers defeated Ulster in the preliminary round, but were narrowly beaten by Leinster in the semi-final, while the University footballers did not survive the preliminary round of the football Railway Cup.

In 1973 the Combined Universities footballers beat Connacht to win the Railway Cup in a final replay at Athlone. This is the only occasion in the history of the Railway Cup that it was not won by a provincial team. The hurlers again beat Ulster but were again beaten by Leinster in the semi-final. In 1974 both the University hurlers and footballers reached the semi-finals, losing to Munster and Leinster, respectively.

The Railway Cup experiment was meeting criticism from within the Universities sector because it was interfering with University League fixtures. In May 1974 Comhairle na nOllscoil decided to opt out of the Railway Cup competition. In lieu of Railway Cup participation, the Universities Committee proposed an annual match between Combined Universities and the Carrolls-sponsored All-Stars teams. There were no representative matches in 1975. The Management Committee of the GAA arranged for games between Combined Universities and the Carrolls All-Stars in Limerick on 25 January 1976 in aid the Northern Ireland Relief Fund. However, for a variety of reasons, these proposed representative games were abandoned. In April 1976 Combined Universities v State Services (Garda & Army) games took place at the Mardyke in Cork. These matches developed into a triangular series, and then the quadrangular series with the addition of Advanced Colleges, that lasted into the 1990s.

Gaelic Football

Combined Universities Captains
 1974:
 1973: Paud Lynch (UCC & Kerry)/Brendan Lynch (UCC & Kerry)
 1972:

Hurling

Combined Universities Captains
 1974:
 1973: John Buckley (UCC & Cork)
 1972: Pat McDonnell (UCC & Cork)

References

Hurling in Ireland
Gaelic football in Ireland
Gaelic games at Irish universities